Gustavo Adolfo Dudamel Ramírez (born 26 January 1981) is a Venezuelan conductor and violinist.  He is currently music director of the Simón Bolívar Symphony Orchestra, the Los Angeles Philharmonic, and the Paris Opera. In February 2023, Dudamel announced that he would be leaving Los Angeles, California after the 2025–2026 orchestral season to become conductor of the New York Philharmonic.

Early life
Dudamel was born in Barquisimeto, Venezuela, the son of a trombonist and a voice teacher.  He studied music from an early age, becoming involved with El Sistema, the famous Venezuelan musical education program, and took up the violin at age ten. He soon began to study composition. He attended the Jacinto Lara Conservatory, where José Luis Jiménez was among his violin teachers. He then went on to work with José Francisco del Castillo at the Latin-American Violin Academy.

Dudamel began to study conducting in 1995, first with Rodolfo Saglimbeni, then later with José Antonio Abreu. In 1999, he was appointed music director of the Orquesta Sinfónica Simón Bolívar, the national youth orchestra of Venezuela, and toured several countries. He attended Charles Dutoit's master class in Buenos Aires, Argentina in 2002, and worked as assistant conductor to Simon Rattle in Berlin, Germany and Salzburg, Austria in 2003.

Career

Conducting
Dudamel won a number of competitions, including the Gustav Mahler Conducting Competition in Germany in 2004.  His reputation began to spread, attracting the attention of conductors such as Simon Rattle and Claudio Abbado, who accepted invitations to conduct the Simón Bolívar Orchestra in Veneite. In April 2006 Dudamel was appointed as principal conductor of the Gothenburg Symphony for the 2007/2008 season.
 
Dudamel made his debut at La Scala, Milan, with Don Giovanni in November 2006. On 10 September 2007, he conducted the Vienna Philharmonic for the first time at the Lucerne Festival. On 16 April 2007 he conducted the Stuttgart Radio Symphony Orchestra at the Vatican's Paul VI Audience Hall in a concert in commemoration of the 80th birthday of Pope Benedict XVI, with Hilary Hahn as solo violinist, with the Pope and many other Church dignitaries among the audience.

In 2011, he featured in the documentary Dudamel, Let the Children Play directed by the Venezuelan filmmaker Alberto Arvelo.

In 2013, Dudamel conducted the Simon Bolivar Symphony Orchestra during the funeral of Venezuelan President Hugo Chávez.  Dudamel continues to retain his position with the Simón Bolívar National Youth Orchestra.
In April 2014 Dudamel returned to conduct with Gothenburg Symphony Orchestra, as its honorary conductor, for concerts in the orchestra's home city and on tour in France, Switzerland, and Italy.

In 2015, Dudamel conducted both the opening and end titles, at the behest of famed film composer John Williams, for the official motion picture soundtrack and film of Star Wars: The Force Awakens. At the 2016 Super Bowl, Dudamel and Youth Orchestra Los Angeles (YOLA) accompanied Coldplay and sang along with Chris Martin, Beyoncé, and Bruno Mars.

On 1 January 2017, Dudamel conducted the Vienna Philharmonic in their traditional New Year's Day Concert; at the age of only 35, he is the youngest guest conductor in history to lead this event. In December 2018, he made his debut at the Metropolitan Opera in New York City, conducting Verdi's Otello.

Dudamel served as the 2018–2019 artist-in-residence at Princeton University in New Jersey near New York, in celebration of Princeton University Concerts' 125th anniversary. This engagement included cross-disciplinary and cross-cultural panels & discussions, chamber concerts featuring musicians from his associated orchestras (the Met, in NYC; Los Angeles; and Berlin), and in April 2019, Dudamel conducted the Princeton University Orchestra and the Princeton University Glee Club as the culmination of his year-long residency.

In the summer of 2019, Dudamel conducted the orchestra during the recording sessions for Steven Spielberg's film adaptation of West Side Story, set for release on 10 December 2021.

Dudamel first guest-conducted at the Opéra national de Paris in 2017.  In April 2021, the Opéra National de Paris announced the appointment of Dudamel as its next music director, effective 1 August 2021, with an initial contract of six seasons.

Los Angeles Philharmonic
Dudamel made his US conducting debut with the Los Angeles Philharmonic (LAP) at the Hollywood Bowl on 13 September 2005 in a program consisting of "La Noche de los Mayas" by Silvestre Revueltas and Tchaikovsky's Symphony No. 5.  Dudamel was subsequently invited back to conduct the orchestra at Walt Disney Concert Hall in January 2007 in performances of "Dances of Galánta" by Zoltán Kodály, the third piano concerto of Sergei Rachmaninoff with Yefim Bronfman as soloist, and Béla Bartók's Concerto for Orchestra (the latter of which was recorded live and subsequently released by Deutsche Grammophon).

In April 2007, the LAP announced the appointment of Dudamel as its next music director, effective with the 2009–2010 season.  His initial contract in Los Angeles was for five years, beginning in September 2009.  In February 2011, the orchestra announced the extension of Dudamel's contract through the end of the 2018–2019 season.  In March 2015, the orchestra announced a further extension of his Los Angeles Philharmonic contract through the 2021–2022 season.  In January 2020, the LAP announced a further extension of his contract through the 2025–2026 season.  In February 2023, the LAP announced that Dudamel is to conclude his music directorship of the orchestra at the close of the 2025–2026 season.

New York Philharmonic
Dudamel first guest-conducted the New York Philharmonic in 2007.  Following 26 additional guest-conducting appearances with the orchestra, the New York Philharmonic announced the appointment of Dudamel as its next music director, effective with the 2026–2027 season, with an initial contract of 5 years.

Awards and media
Dudamel is featured in the documentary film Tocar y Luchar, which covers El Sistema.  Dudamel and the Orquesta Sinfónica Simón Bolívar received the WQXR Gramophone Special Recognition Award in New York City in November 2007.  Another US television news feature on Dudamel was on 60 Minutes in February 2008, entitled "Gustavo the Great."

On 23 July 2009, Dudamel was selected by the Eighth Glenn Gould Prize laureate José Antonio Abreu as winner of the prestigious The City of Toronto Glenn Gould Protégé Prize.

Dudamel was named one of Times Magazine's most influential 100 people in 2010.

Dudamel is featured in the 2011 documentary Let the Children Play, a film which focuses on his work advocating for music as a way to enrich children's lives.

Gramophone named Dudamel its 2011 Gramophone Artist of the Year. Also in 2011, he was inducted into the Royal Swedish Academy of Music. In February 2012, Dudamel won a Grammy Award for Best Orchestral Performance, for his recording of Brahms Symphony No. 4 for the label Deutsche Grammophon. In 2013, Dudamel was named Musical America's Musician of the Year and was inducted into the Gramophone Hall of Fame.  Dudamel received the Leonard Bernstein Lifetime Achievement Award for the Elevation of Music in Society from the Longy School in 2014 and the Americas Society Cultural Achievement Award in 2016.

The character of Rodrigo in Amazon's Mozart in the Jungle was based, in part, on Dudamel. In the first episode of the show's second season, in which Rodrigo appears as a guest conductor for the Los Angeles Philharmonic, Dudamel appears as a guest actor, playing the part of a stage manager.

In June 2018, Dudamel received Chile's Pablo Neruda Order of Artistic and Cultural Merit. Also in June, the Venezuelan American Endowment for the Arts (VAEA) awarded Dudamel the Paez Medal of Art 2018.

Dudamel is featured as the name of an achievement in the game A Rite from the Stars, released on 19 July 2018. The player gets it for solving a music puzzle in less than 14 seconds.

In August 2018, Dudamel announced plans for the LA Phil's 2018/2019 centennial season, including an unprecedented 50 commissions of new music and a Frank Gehry-designed permanent home for Dudamel's YOLA youth orchestra.

On 18 October 2018, Dudamel was announced as the 25th recipient of the Dorothy and Lillian Gish Prize

Dudamel received a star on the Hollywood Walk of Fame on 22 January 2019. In his speech accepting it, he said that it should belong to Venezuela, the country he is from, and that "tomorrow [23 Jan. 2019] is a crucial day [and] the voice of the masses must be heard and respected", referring to the planned national protest on that date and the 2019 Venezuelan presidential crisis.

At the 64th Annual Grammy Awards the Grammy Award for Best Choral Performance was given to the Dudamel-conducted 2019 recording of Symphony No. 8 (Mahler).

Personal life
Dudamel has been married twice. His first marriage, in 2006, was to Eloísa Maturén in Caracas. Maturén, also a Venezuelan native, is a classically trained ballet dancer  and a journalist. The two had a son, Martín Dudamel Maturén, on 1 April 2011.  In March 2015, Dudamel and Maturén filed papers for divorce. In February 2017, Dudamel secretly married Spanish actress María Valverde, whom he had first met in 2016, in Las Vegas, Nevada. He became a Spanish citizen in 2018.  He and Valverde reside in Spain.

Discography 
2006
 Beethoven: Symphonies Nos. 5 & 7 [w/ the Simón Bolívar Youth Orchestra of Venezuela] CD

2007
 Birthday Concert for Pope Benedict XVI [w/ Hilary Hahn & the Radio-Sinfonieorchester Stuttgart] DVD
 Mahler: Symphony No. 5 [w/ the Simón Bolívar Youth Orchestra of Venezuela] CD
 Bartók: Concerto for Orchestra [w/ the Los Angeles Philharmonic] Digital Download only

2008
 The Promise of Music [w/ the Simón Bolívar Youth Orchestra of Venezuela] DVD
 Fiesta [w/ the Simón Bolívar Youth Orchestra of Venezuela] CD
 Berlioz: Symphonie Fantastique [w/ the Los Angeles Philharmonic] Digital Download only

2009
 Gustavo Dudamel and the Los Angeles Philharmonic: The Inaugural Concert  [w/ the Los Angeles Philharmonic] DVD; e-Video
 Mahler: Symphony No. 1 (From the Inaugural Concert) [w/ the Los Angeles Philharmonic] Digital Download only
 Discoveries [w/ the Simón Bolívar Youth Orchestra of Venezuela] CD
 Live from Salzburg [w/ the Simón Bolívar Youth Orchestra of Venezuela] DVD
 Tchaikovsky: Symphony No. 5; Francesca da Rimini [w/ the Simón Bolívar Youth Orchestra of Venezuela] CD
 Piotr Anderszewski: Voyageur intranquille; a film by Bruno Monsaingeon. Credited: with the artistic participation of Philharmonia Orchestra London – conducted by Gustavo Dudamel] Blu-ray

2010
 Celebración – Opening Night Concert & Gala [w/ Juan Diego Flórez and the Los Angeles Philharmonic] DVD; Digital Download
 John Adams: City Noir (From the Inaugural Concert)  [w/ the Los Angeles Philharmonic] Digital Download only
 Rite [w/ the Simón Bolívar Youth Orchestra of Venezuela] CD

2011
 Sibelius: Symphony No. 2 – Nielsen: Symphonies Nos. 4 & 5 – Bruckner: Symphony No. 9 [w/ the Gothenburg Symphony Orchestra] CD
 Tchaikovsky & Shakespeare [w/ the Simón Bolívar Symphony Orchestra of Venezuela] CD
 New Year's Eve Concert 2010 [w/ Elīna Garanča and the Berliner Philharmoniker] DVD
 John Adams: Slonimsky's Earbox – Bernstein: Symphony No. 1 "Jeremiah" [w/ the Los Angeles Philharmonic] Digital Download only
 Brahms: Symphony No. 4 [w/ the Los Angeles Philharmonic] Digital Download only

2012
 An American in Paris [w/ the Los Angeles Philharmonic] e-Video only
 Dances and Waves [w/ the Vienna Philharmonic] CD; DVD; Digital Download
 Mendelssohn: Symphony No. 3 [w/ the Vienna Philharmonic] Vinyl only (LP)
 Beethoven: Symphony No. 3, "Eroica" [w/ the Simón Bolívar Symphony Orchestra of Venezuela] CD
 Discoveries [w/ Simón Bolívar Symphony Orchestra of Venezuela, Berliner Philharmoniker, Wiener Philharmoniker, Gothenburg Symphony Orchestra] CD+DVD; Digital Download
 Mahler: Symphony No. 8 [w/ Los Angeles Philharmonic and the Simón Bolívar Symphony Orchestra of Venezuela] DVD; Blu-ray; e-Video

2013
 Mahler: Symphony No. 9 [w/ Los Angeles Philharmonic] CD
 Verdi: Messa da Requiem [w/ Los Angeles Philharmonic and Los Angeles Master Chorale] Blu-ray
 Rachmaninov: Piano Concerto No. 3; Prokofiev: Piano Concerto No. 2 [w/ Yuja Wang, piano and Simon Bolivar Symphony Orchestra of Venezuela] CD
 Richard Strauss: Also Sprach Zarathustra; Till Eulenspiegels lustige Streiche; Don Juan [w/ Berliner Philarmoniker]

2014
 Mahler: Symphony No. 7. [w/ Símon Bolívar Symphony Orchestra of Venezuela] CD
 Gustavo Dudamel: The Liberator (Libertador); Original Soundtrack [w/ Orquesta Sinfónica Simón Bolívar de Venezuela] CD
 John Adams: The Gospel According to the Other Mary, a passion oratorio in two acts [w/ Los Angeles Philharmonic and Los Angeles Master Chrale] CD

2015
 Wagner [w/ Símon Bolívar Symphony Orchestra of Venezuela] Digital Download
 Philip Glass: Double Piano Concerto [w/ Katia and Marielle Labeque (Piano), Los Angeles Philharmonic] Only at iTunes
 John Williams: Star Wars: The Force Awakens. [Special guest conductor for four tacks] CD, DVD, Blu-ray, Digital Download

2017
 New Year Concert [w/ Vienna Philharmonic] CDs and Digital download.

2018
 The Nutcracker and the Four Realms original soundtrack CD and Digital Download

2022
  Dvořák: Symphonies Nos. 7–9 w/ Los Angeles Philharmonic Digital Download

References

Further reading

External links 
 
 
 

1981 births
Living people
21st-century conductors (music)
Venezuelan conductors (music)
Male conductors (music)
Venezuelan classical musicians
People from Barquisimeto
Deutsche Grammophon artists
Grammy Award winners
Venezuelan expatriates in the United States
City of Toronto's Glenn Gould Protégé Prize winners
Naturalised citizens of Spain
21st-century male musicians